Rud Pish Rural District is a rural district (dehestan) in the Central District of Fuman County, Gilan Province, Iran. At the 2006 census, its population was 14,666, in 3,910 families. The rural district has 29 villages.

References 

Rural Districts of Gilan Province
Fuman County